This is a list of the locations within the city of Brighton and Hove.

A
Adelaide, Aldrington

B
Bear Road area, Bevendean, Black Rock, Brighton, Brighton Marina (a.k.a. Brighton Marina Village), Brunswick

C
Coldean

E
East Brighton, East Moulsecoomb, Elm Grove

F
Fiveways

G
Goldsmid

H
Hangleton, Hanover, Hollingbury, Hollingdean, Hove

K
Kemp Town (the Regency housing development), Kemptown (the wider neighbourhood), The Knoll

L

The Lanes

M
Mile Oak, Moulsecoomb

N
New England Quarter, North Laine, North Moulsecoomb

O
Ovingdean

P
Patcham, Portslade-by-Sea, Portslade Village, Preston, Preston Park, Prestonville

Q
Queen's Park

R
Roedean, Round Hill, Rottingdean

S
Saltdean, Seven Dials, Stanford, Stanmer, Stanmer Park, Surrenden

T
Tongdean

U
Upper Bevendean

V
Varndean

W
West Blatchington, West Hill, Westdene, Whitehawk, Withdean, Woodingdean

Brighton and Hove
Brighton and Hove-related lists